Karaman Museum is in Karaman, Turkey

It is to the east of the Karaman Castle. The museum was established in 1980.

In the museum there are two halls one reserved for the archaeological items and one for the ethnographical items. In these halls items from epipaleolithic age, Neolithic age, chalcolithic age, Bronze Age, classic age, Roman Empire, Byzantine Empire, Seljuks , Anatolian Beyliks (mainly Karamanids) and the Ottoman Empire are exhibited. Some of the items are,  earthenware kitchen tools, ornaments, teardrop bottles, weapons etc. In the windows coinage of the said eras are exhibited.

One notable item is the corpse of so-called "manazan woman". She was a young woman whose corpse was found in a cave named "manazan". With radiocarbon methods the corpse is dated to 1000-1200 B.C. But her clothes and hair as well as parts of her flesh have remained almost intact because of the clay rocks covering her body.

References

External links
Virtual tour

Buildings and structures in Karaman Province
1980 establishments in Turkey
Archaeological museums in Turkey
Museums established in 1980